Ervin Ralph Pitts (September 14, 1920 – January 17, 1999) was an American football, basketball, and baseball coach and college athletics administrator. He served as a head coach at Dakota Wesleyan University in Madison, South Dakota in football (1954 to 1955) and basketball (1954 to 1956). Pitts then served in a similar capacity at Peru State College in Peru, Nebraska, first as a head football coach (1964 to 1968) and then as head men's basketball coach (1973).

A native of Coffeyville, Kansas, Pitts played college football at the University of Missouri.  As a quarterback for the Missouri Tigers, he led a split-T offense for head coach Don Faurot.

Head coaching record

College football

References

External links
 

1920 births
1999 deaths
American football quarterbacks
Basketball coaches from Kansas
Dakota Wesleyan Tigers football coaches
Dakota Wesleyan Tigers men's basketball coaches
Missouri Tigers football players
Peru State Bobcats athletic directors
Peru State Bobcats football coaches
Peru State Bobcats men's basketball coaches
South Dakota Coyotes baseball coaches
South Dakota Coyotes football coaches
High school football coaches in Missouri
High school football coaches in Washington (state)
People from Coffeyville, Kansas
People from Neodesha, Kansas
Players of American football from Kansas